Abdul Jalilul Akbar was the tenth Sultan of Brunei. He succeeded his father, Muhammad Hassan, in 1598 and ruled until his death in 1659. When he ascended to the throne, his uncle Pengiran Di-Gadong Sahibul Mal Besar Omar acted as his regent.

Life
His Highness was the son of Sultan Muhammad Hassan, the ninth ruler of Brunei. Before he ascended to the throne, he was known as Raja Tua Abdul Jalil. He married a princess from Java, Radin Mas Ayu Siti Aishah, the daughter of Kiyai Temenggong Manchu Negoro from Gersik. From their marriage, they bore Sultan Abdul Jalilul Jabbar, Sultan Muhyiddin, Raja Omar, Pengiran Derma Wangsa Pengiran Muda Bongsu, Pengiran Di-Gadong Sahibul Mal Raja Damit Shahbudin and four unknown daughters.

His Highness had other children from his other wives including Pengiran Muda Besar Abdullah (father of Sultan Nasruddin), Raja Tengah and Raja Besar.

European contacts 
During his reign, he made numerous contacts with the European powers. He stabilized diplomatic relations with the Spaniards who were based in Manila in 1599.

In December 1600 and January 1601, a Dutchman named Olivier van Noort visited Brunei who left vivid accounts about Brunei. Although he did not mention the name of the ruling sultan at that time, Van Noort managed to describe that the Brunei king was under the guardianship of his uncle who acted as his regent.

In 1612, a British sailor, Sir Henry Middleton visited Brunei as part of his voyage to the East Indies.

Death
His Highness died in 1659. He ruled the sultanate for sixty-one years. After his demise, he was known as Marhum Tua. He was succeeded by his son, Abdul Jalilul Jabbar.

See also
 List of Sultans of Brunei

References

16th-century Sultans of Brunei
Year of birth missing
Year of death missing
17th-century Sultans of Brunei